"Come See Me and Come Lonely" is a song written by Red Lane, and recorded by American country music artist Dottie West.  It was released in May 1978 as the first single from the album Dottie.  The song peaked at number 17 on the Billboard Hot Country Singles chart. In addition, "Come See Me and Come Lonely" peaked at number 28 on the Canadian RPM Country chart. Later in the year, the single was released onto West's 1978 album entitled Dottie. It was the only single released from the album.

In 2017, Pam Tillis and Lorrie Morgan covered the song on their duets album of the same name.

Chart performance

References

1978 singles
Dottie West songs
Lorrie Morgan songs
Pam Tillis songs
Song recordings produced by Larry Butler (producer)
United Artists Records singles
Songs written by Red Lane
1978 songs